Stuttgart declaration may refer to:

The Stuttgart Declaration of Guilt issued by the Evangelical Church in Germany on 19 October 1945
The Solemn Declaration on European Union adopted in Stuttgart by the member states of the European Communities on 19 June 1983